Merapi (minor planet designation: 536 Merapi) is a main belt asteroid orbiting the Sun. It was discovered by American astronomer George Henry Peters on May 11, 1904, from Washington, D.C.

Photometric observations of this asteroid at the Oakley Observatory in Terre Haute, Indiana, during 2006 gave a light curve with a period of 8.809 ± 0.008 hours and a brightness variation of 0.23 ± 0.05 in magnitude.

References

External links
 Lightcurve plot of (536) Merapi, Antelope Hills Observatory
 
 

Cybele asteroids
Merapi
Merapi
X-type asteroids (Tholen)
19040511